Ingelin (and its variant Ingelinn) is a feminine given name. Notable people with the name are as follows:

 Ingelin Angerborn (born 1966), Swedish writer 
 Ingelin Killengreen (born 1947), Norwegian jurist 
 Ingelinn Lossius-Skeie (born 1976), Norwegian politician
 Ingelin Noresjø (born 1976), Norwegian politician

Norwegian feminine given names